Tang Danhong (born November 1965), is a poet and film director from mainland China and living in Israel since 2005. Her work has highlighted the lives of the many ethnic minorities in China, including the Tibetans and Uyghurs.

Early life and education 
Tang Danhong was born in Chengdu, Sichuan. She graduated from the Library and Information Department of Sichuan University in 1986, and worked in the library of the West China University of Medical Sciences for four years. From 1991 to 1992 she worked in a gallery in Chengdu.

Career

Writing 
In early 1994, Tang opened the Kafka Bookstore in the old city of Chengdu in Renhou Street. This literary bookstore was popular with visitors to the city. Around 1999, the bookstore closed and Tang disappeared from the Chengdu cultural scene, resurfacing in Tel Aviv several years later. A collection of poems she wrote in China during this period (1992–2002) were published in 2012 as X-ray, Sweet Night in 2012.

Tang's writing has frequently appeared China Digital Times. In 2008, she published an essay about her feeling as a Han Chinese person about Tibet. In 2010 she traveled to India to collect oral histories from elderly Tibetan exiles. In 2019 she interviewed Nimrod Baranovitch of the University of Haifa about detained Uyghur poet Ablet Abdurishit Berqi.

Film 
Tang was the director of Chengdu Vientiane Documentary Film Production Company. Her first documentary film Tsurphu Monastery ( was filmed in February 1998. Her major works include Dzachuka, Nyma the Conqueror, At the Gate of Reincarnation-Tibetan Funeral Customs, Top Adventure-98 Yarlung Zangbo River Rafting Adventure, Nightingale, Not the Only Voice (2000).Nightingale follows the lives of three artists in Chengdu and conveys their feelings of oppression in the modern market economy.

Personal life 
Tang divorced in 2001. She later met an Israeli man studying Chinese medicine. They married and moved to Israel in late 2005. There, Tang taught Mandarin at Tel Aviv University.

Views on Tibet 
When discussing the Chinese Communist Party's repression against Tibet, Tang argued that it would only push more Tibetans to advocate for autonomy and even independence from the central government.

"Tibet is disappearing. The spirit which makes her beautiful and peaceful is disappearing. She is becoming us, becoming what she does not want to become. What other choice does she have when facing the anxiety of being alienated? To hold onto her tradition and culture, and revive her ancient civilization? Or to commit suicidal acts which will only add to Han nationalists’ bloody, shameful glory?"

External links 
 
 
 , Tang Danhong's blog

References

Living people
1965 births
Chinese film directors
Chinese women film directors
Han Chinese people
Writers from Chengdu
Chinese women poets
20th-century Chinese women writers
21st-century Chinese women writers
20th-century Chinese poets
21st-century Chinese poets